is a 2019 action role-playing game developed by Nihon Falcom. A part of the Ys series, it first released in Japan for the PlayStation 4 before it saw a worldwide release by NIS America in February 2021. The game received additional releases for Windows, Nintendo Switch and Stadia in July 2021, and PlayStation 5 in May 2023. Ys IX received generally positive reviews from critics.

Gameplay
Ys IX: Monstrum Nox is an action role-playing game played from a third-person perspective. It further builds on the gameplay foundation of Ys VIII: Lacrimosa of Dana, where players control multiple main characters that can be switched between on-the-fly, each with their own play styles and unique skills. Players collect a variety of weapons and items by defeating enemies and opening chests.

Players can consume SP to unleash a character's unique skill attack, and SP can be restored by landing hits on enemies or it can regenerate faster when the player is not attacking. Boost mode, a returning game mechanic from Ys: The Oath in Felghana and Ys Origin, temporarily increases damage dealt, decreases damage received, and increases attack and movement speeds.

New to Ys IX, each party member has traversal abilities, called Monstrum Gifts, such as gliding and running up walls. Players can reach various places and locate hidden secrets in the city of Balduq and dungeons by utilizing these actions.

Development 
Ys IX: Monstrum Nox was initially teased as Project N.O.X before being revealed on December 19, 2018. Nihon Falcom president Toshihiro Kondo stated that he wanted the next Ys game to lean more towards the adventure genre, with Dana's arc in Ys VIII: Lacrimosa of Dana as a hint. In another interview, Kondo said that he wanted to take the new axis of direction and movement introduced in Ys VIII: Lacrimosa of Dana to the next level, citing examples such as an air dash or a hook shot.

The game was developed by Nihon Falcom and released for the PlayStation 4 in Japan on September 26, 2019. It was released by NIS America for the PlayStation 4 in North America, Europe and Australasia respectively on February 2, February 5, and February 12, 2021, with additional releases for Windows, Nintendo Switch, and Stadia in July 2021. Nippon Ichi Software released the Nintendo Switch version in Japan on September 9, 2021. The Windows version was ported by Engine Software and PH3 Games. The Switch version was ported by Engine Software. A PlayStation 5 version is scheduled for release in North America on May 9, in Europe on May 12, and in Australasia on May 19, 2023.

Reception 

Ys IX: Monstrum Nox received "generally favorable" reviews, according to review aggregator Metacritic. Japanese magazine Famitsu scored the PlayStation 4 version a 35 out of 40. 4gamer.net recommended the game for players who enjoy exploration, while remarking upon the game's difficulty as being well-balanced. The game sold 45,378 copies during its launch week in Japan.

Notes

References

External links
 

2019 video games
Action role-playing video games
Nintendo Switch games
PlayStation 4 games
Stadia games
Single-player video games
Video games developed in Japan
Windows games
Ys (series)
Nihon Falcom games
Engine Software games